This list of black Academy Award winners and nominees is fully current as the 95th Academy Awards, which was held on March 12, 2023.

Best Actor in a Leading Role

Best Actress in a Leading Role

Best Actor in a Supporting Role

Best Actress in a Supporting Role

Best Animated Feature

Best Cinematography

Best Costume Design

Best Director

Best Documentary Feature

Best Documentary Short Subject

Best Film Editing

Best International Feature Film

In the International Feature Film category (formerly known as Best Foreign Language Film), although the Oscar is presented to and accepted by the film's director, the submitting country is officially credited as the nominee, not the director. The following is a list of films directed by Black people which have been nominated for Best International Feature Film.

Best Makeup and Hairstyling

Best Music, Original Score

Best Music, Original Song

Best Picture

Best Production Design

Best Short Film (Animated)

Best Short Film (Live Action)

Best Sound

Best Writing (Adapted Screenplay)

Best Writing (Original Screenplay)

Special awards

See also

 Cheryl Boone Isaacs, first African-American president of the Academy of Motion Picture Arts and Sciences (but not herself an Oscar winner or nominee)
 List of African Academy Award winners and nominees
 List of African-American Tony nominees and winners
 List of Asian Academy Award winners and nominees
 List of Black Golden Globe Award winners and nominees
 List of Hispanic-American (U.S.) Academy Award winners and nominees
 List of indigenous Academy Award winners and nominees

References

General sources
 

Black